Lambda Leporis, which is the Latinized form of λ Leporis, is a solitary, blue-white hued star in the southern constellation of Lepus. It is visible to the naked eye with an apparent visual magnitude of +4.29. Based upon an annual parallax shift of 3.83 mas, it is estimated to lie roughly 850 light years from the Sun. It is a member of the Orion OB1 association (Ori OB1), and it has been identified as a high-velocity runaway star.

This is a massive, B-type main-sequence star with a corrected stellar classification of B0.5 V. It is an estimated eight million years old and is spinning with a projected rotational velocity of 30 km/s. This star has around 15 times the mass of the Sun and 4.5 times the Sun's radius. It is radiating 15,488 times the Sun's luminosity from its photosphere at an effective temperature of 30,400 K.

References

B-type subgiants
Lepus (constellation)
Leporis, Lambda
Durchmusterung objects
Leporis, 06
034816
024845
1756